The University of Perpetual Help System Dalta - Molino Campus (UPHSD Molino) or simply Perpetual, was founded on 1995 in Bacoor, Cavite, Philippines. It is a private, non-sectarian educational institution run by the Dalta Group of Companies, and is part of the University of Perpetual Help System.

The Molino campus was established and inaugurated in May 1995. The number of students has increased from the initial figure of 700 to 4,500.

Sections
 Grade 7 level - Diamond, Pearl, Emerald, Amethyst, Ruby, Jade, Aquamarine
 Grade 8 level - Earth, Venus, Mars, Saturn, Neptune, Jupiter
 Grade 9 level - Einstein, Galileo, Aristotle, Ptolemy, Pascal, Descartes, Darwin
 Grade 10 level - Rizal, Aguinaldo, Bonifacio, Del Pilar, Quezon, Jacinto

The First Sections mentioned are the star sections/pilot sections.

The 2nd UPH branch, the Molino campus was established and inaugurated in May 1995. Currently, the UPH caters to a student population of 4,000 - a dramatic increase based on its initial 700 enrollees. Standing tall in a pristine land area of 6 hectares, the UPH Molino campus is now the most notable educational institution in Bacoor, Cavite and its neighboring towns. It is currently undergoing campus expansion and upgrading of facilities. More than its structure, the people that comprise this thriving institution have continuously grown physically, intellectually, socially and spiritually as they consistently uphold the philosophy of the main arm UPH: to constantly invoke Divine Guidance in the betterment of Filipino lives through quality education.

Philosophy
The Research and Development Center upholds the integrity of UPHSD through the conduct of quality, relevant and trendsetting researches in the fields of education and arts, health, science & technology, business and industry, geared toward the improvement of the quality of life, sustain national development and support the goal of attaining global competitiveness.

Vision
The Research and Development Center envisions to continually foster excellent -scholarly researches to sustain research intensiveness.

Mission
The Research and Development Center shall commit to the attainment of the three-pronged thrust of the university through excellent academic researches supporting the ideals of teaching through quality instruction and community extension.

Student organizations

 The Junior-Supreme Student Council - It is also known as the JR SSC. This is the highest student body of the Department. The Student Council is tasked with the responsibility of ensuring teamwork between students and the administration and faculty. They are the one who held projects for the department and programs like cultural show.
 The Junior Perpetualite - An organization of campus writers and enthusiasts who are responsible for writing news and literary articles in the Junior Perpetualite Tabloid. It aims to develop the student's creative writing abilities and trains him to manage and publish a paper.
 Year Level Council - An organization for all class officers in a year level. The elected president of the year level council is automatic appointed as the representative of the year level to the Junior Supreme Student Council.
 Homeroom Class Organization - Also known as the class officers; An organization of the members of a particular section or a class in a year level.

Student Interest Clubs

Math Club
Science Club
English Club
Social Studies Club
Future Homemakers Club (FHCP)
Artists Guild (Arts Club)
Writers Guild
Actors Guild
Performing Arts Group
Scouting Movement
Peer Facilitators Group
Business High Society
Computer Society
Drum and Lyre Corps
Young Perpetualites for Christ
Readers Society ** (created 2014)
Debators and Orators Society ** (created 2014)
Modern Dance Group ** (created 2014)

See also

 Statefields School
 Saint Francis of Assisi College System

External links
ph/ The OFFICIAL Website of UPHSD
University of Perpetual Help DALTA Medical Center
Student Life - UPHSD

Universities and colleges in Cavite
University of Perpetual Help System
Education in Bacoor
Educational institutions established in 1995
1995 establishments in the Philippines